This is a list of active and extinct volcanoes in Vietnam.

References 

Vietnam
 
Volcanoes